is a Japanese term meaning literally "rare taste", but more appropriately "delicacy".  They are local cuisines that have fallen out of popularity or those cuisines that are peculiar to a certain area.  Many involve pickled seafood.

List of chinmi

Hokkaidō area
 Hizunamasu
 Ikanankotsu - Cooked soft bones of squid
 Kankai - Dried Komai fish.  It may be eaten as is, or broiled and eaten with a sauce made by mixing mayonnaise and soy sauce and sprinkles of red pepper powder.
 Kirikomi
 Matsumaezuke
 Mefun
 Saketoba - A smoked salmon
 Tachikama
 Uni

Tōhoku area
 Awabi no Kimo - Ground internal organs of abalone
 Donpiko - The heart of a salmon.  As only one can be taken from a fish, it is very rare.
 Hoya - sea pineapple
 Momijizuke - Shreds of fresh salmons and Ikura pickled together
 Tonburi - A speciality of Akita prefecture.  The dried seeds of the hosagi plant.

Kanto area
 Ankimo - Either fresh or steamed liver of an Anko fish
 Kusaya - Dried and pickled fish of Izu islands

Chūbu area
 Fugu no Ranso no Nukazuke - detoxed blowfish ovary in rice-bran
 Hebo
 Ika no Maruboshi
 Inago no Tsukudani
 Konowata
 Kuchiko
 Kurozukuri
 Zazamushi

Kinki area
 Daitokuji Natto
 Funazushi
 Kinzanji Miso

Chūgoku area
 Hiroshimana

Shikoku area
 Chorogi
 Katsuo no Heso
 Shuto
 Dorome

Kyūshū area
 Ganzuke (Saga)
 Karashi Mentaiko (Fukuoka)
 Karashi Renkon (Kumamoto)
 Karasumi (Nagasaki)
 Okyuto (Fukuoka)

Okinawa area
 Tofuyo
 Umibudo  - A type of edible seaweed with tiny seeds that hang from its stems

See also
Acquired taste

Japanese cuisine
Roe